Out of Order is a 1990 farce written by English playwright Ray Cooney.  It had a long run at the Shaftesbury Theatre starring Donald Sinden and Michael Williams.

As with many other Ray Cooney plays, it features a lead actor (in this case a junior UK minister) who has to lie his way out of an embarrassing situation (in this case a planned adultery with a secretary) with the help of an innocent side-kick (in this case the minister's personal private secretary), who gets more and more embroiled in the increasingly tangled tale improvised by the lead character as events unfold. The action takes place in a suite in a posh London hotel and revolves around accidents caused by a defective sash window.

In 1996, the play was adapted in France as Panique au Plazza, starring Christian Clavier and Gérard Lartigau.
In 1997 the play was made into a successful Hungarian movie A Miniszter Félrelép. The 2019 Italian comedy film Natale a cinque stelle is based on the plot.

The play has also been staged internationally in Singapore and Kuala Lumpur in April 2012, by the British Theatre Playhouse. Other recent productions have been at the Moscow Art Theatre in Moscow, Russia under the name "№ 13D", in Beijing, China, and in a Hindi adaptation as "Sweet Suite" in Delhi, India.

Further reading

References

West End plays
1990 plays
Comedy plays
Plays by Ray Cooney
Laurence Olivier Award-winning plays
Plays set in London